The Seneca Indian School was a Native American boarding school located in Wyandotte, Oklahoma. Initially founded for Seneca, Shawnee, and Wyandotte children, in later years it had many Cherokee students. The school operated from 1872 to 1980.

History 
The Wyandotte tribe was removed to this area in 1867. The Society of Friends (Quakers) established a mission in Wyandotte in 1869. The Wyandotte Tribal Council donated land for the Quakers to establish a boarding school for Seneca, Shawnee and Wyandotte children. Construction of the school began in 1871 and classes began in 1872.

Other names for the school were Wyandotte Mission, Seneca, Shawnee, and Wyandotte Industrial Boarding School, and Seneca Boarding School. By the 1920s, the composition of the student body had changed, and was largely Cherokee students.

The school had an outbreak of measles and typhoid in 1927, and "dozens of children" died.

In 1928, a new principal was appointed, Joe Kagey. The school changed its admittance policy, and was opened to children of all tribes. It became an "institutional" school for children coming from situations of hardship. In 1952, there were 173 Cherokee students, and a number of students from other tribes. Kagey retired in 1956.
The school closed on June 15, 1980. The school's 189 acres of land were returned to the Wyandotte Tribe.

A selection of school records created between 1916-1970 are held by the National Archives.

References

External links 

 Seneca Indian School, between Wyandotte and Highway 60
Seneca Indian School photographs, National Museum of the American Indian

"History of Seneca Indian School", compiled by Margaret Schiffbauer, 1954. 
Correspondence on the Seneca Indian School in the Fred R. Harris collection

Educational institutions established in 1872
Seneca tribe
Wyandot
Shawnee history
Boarding schools in Oklahoma
Schools in Ottawa County, Oklahoma
Native American boarding schools
Public schools in Oklahoma
1872 establishments in Indian Territory
Native American history of Oklahoma